Nocardioides zeicaulis is a Gram-positive and aerobic bacterium from the genus Nocardioides which has been isolated from the stem of a maize plant (Zea mays).

References 

 

zeicaulis
Bacteria described in 2016